Party and government-sponsored media must hold the family name of the party, often abbreviated as party media takes the party's last name, is a phrase from a speech made by Chinese leader Xi Jinping in 2016, used to emphasize the supremacy of the Chinese Communist Party (CCP) over China's state media.

Origins 
In December 2015, Xi Jinping demanded that military newspapers must be loyal to the party when he inspected the People's Liberation Army Daily.

On February 19, 2016, Xi visited Xinhua News Agency and other media outlets, and during an investigation at China Central Television (CCTV), officials displayed a slogan "CCTV's surname is 'The Party'. [We are] absolutely loyal. Ready for your inspection." Later in the day, Xi said in a meeting that:

Controversies

Ren Zhiqiang's criticism 
Shortly after Xi's visit, Ren Zhiqiang, a property tycoon and party member with more than 30 million followers on Weibo, made a post: "Since when did the people's government become the party's government? Does the money they spend come from party dues? Don't go using taxpayer money to do things that aren't in service of taxpayers," and "when the media are loyal first to the party and don't represent the interests of the people, then the people will be abandoned in a forgotten corner." The posting was removed shortly afterwards, and on February 22, Chinese media outlet Qianlong accused Ren of representing capitalism and attempting to overthrow the CCP. On February 28, the Cyberspace Administration of China ordered Weibo to shut down Ren's account, saying Ren was spreading "illegal messages". However, Ren was not punished further at the time, which was said to be related to the discontent that existed within the party.

Southern Metropolis Daily incident 
On February 20, 2016, Southern Metropolis Daily, a liberal-leaning media outlet, placed Xi's words on its front page together with the news of the death of Yuan Geng, a CCP official, making the front page read, "the media whose surname is party, its soul returns to the sea." Despite the perceived dissatisfaction with the party media's surname discourse, the Southern Metropolis Daily and numerous journalists said it was not intentional and was only a mistake. An announcement circulated a few days later stated that "malicious online interpretations by some people of serious mistakes by editors who have serious deficits in political sensitivity led to a serious guidance incident," and three senior newspaper staffs were disciplined, although all three said they were unaware of the situation. On March 29, Yu Shaolei, a prominent editor of the newspaper, announced his resignation, stating that he could "no longer follow your surname".

See also 
 Propaganda in China
 Xi Jinping Thought
 Document Number Nine
 Chinese information operations and information warfare

References 

Freedom of the press
Mass media in China
Political catchphrases
Propaganda in China
Xi Jinping
Ideology of the Chinese Communist Party